Hazel Jamieson was an American screenwriter known for her work in Hollywood during the 1920s and 1930s.

Biography 
Hazel was born in Stillwater, Minnesota, to John Jamieson and Sarah Brown. Both of her parents hailed from Canada. By 1930, she and her family had moved to Los Angeles, where she was employed in the scenario department at a film studio. Her first credit was on 1929's The Dream Melody. She was married twice: first to Frank Barnes and later to Harry Kraemer.

Selected filmography 

 Reform School (1939)
 Dangerous Waters (1936)
 The Dream Melody (1929)

References 

American women screenwriters
Screenwriters from Minnesota
1892 births
1981 deaths
20th-century American women writers
20th-century American screenwriters